Elisabeth Binder is a medical doctor and neuroscientist specializing in the study of mood and anxiety disorders. She is the director of the Department of Translational Research of the Max Planck Institute of Psychiatry in Munich, Germany. In addition to research, she is a member of the executive committee of the European College of Neuropsychopharmacology (ECNP).

Career

Education
Binder received her MD from the University of Vienna (1995) and completed her PhD in Neuroscience at Emory University in Atlanta, Georgia (2000). Since 2004, she has been an associate professor in the Department of Psychiatry and Behavioral Sciences at Emory University School of Medicine. In 2007 she became a research group leader at the Max Planck Institute of Psychiatry in Munich, Germany. Since 2013 she has been the Director of the Department of Translational Research in Psychiatry of the Institute.

Research focus/interests
As Director of Translational Research in Psychiatry, her major research focus is the identification of mechanisms by which genetic variants and environmental exposure interact to influence stress reactivity and, through these, the risk for affective and anxiety disorders. The ultimate goal of her research is to improve treatment options for patients by better understanding the underlying disease mechanisms.

Awards
Binder has been awarded the Theodore Reich Young Investigator Award, given by the International Society of Psychiatric Genetics and the Max Hamilton Award, bestowed upon scientists who have made outstanding contributions to the field, awarded by the International College of Neuropsychopharmacology (CINP).

In 2016 she became a member of the German Academy of Sciences Leopoldina.

Positions of trust and research assessments
Binder is a member of Munich Center for Neurosciences as well as an associate faculty member of Graduate School of Systemic Neurosciences at Ludwig Maximilian University of Munich. She is a member of the executive committee of the European College of Neuropsychopharmacology (ECNP).

Publications
Binder has published extensively.

Key publications:

References

External links 
“European College of Neuropsychopharmacology (ECNP)”
“Max Planck Society”
CV from Academia Net

1971 births
Living people
21st-century women scientists
Austrian neuroscientists
Austrian women neuroscientists
Members of the German Academy of Sciences Leopoldina
Max Planck Institute directors